Phi Tau is a local, coeducational fraternity at Dartmouth College in Hanover, New Hampshire, USA.

Phi Tau may also refer to:
 Phi Tau, a commonly used nickname for Phi Kappa Tau, a national male-only fraternity with chapters on several college campuses in the United States
 Phi Tauri (often shortened to Phi Tau), a red giant binary star located in the constellation Taurus, visible from Earth with a small telescope